Enrique Sánchez de León Pérez (born 9 June 1934) is a Spanish politician from the Union of the Democratic Centre (UCD) who served as Minister of Health and Social Security from July 1977 to April 1979. From 1977 to 1978 he was also the secretary-general of Extremaduran Regional Action.

References

1934 births
Living people
Complutense University of Madrid alumni
Government ministers of Spain
20th-century Spanish politicians
Health ministers of Spain